C. fenestrata may refer to:
 Cephalia fenestrata, a picture-winged fly species
 Cephaloleia fenestrata, a rolled-leaf beetle species in the genus Cephaloleia found in Costa Rica
 Chrysallida fenestrata, a sea snail species found in the Atlantic Ocean and the Mediterranean Sea
 Clidemia fenestrata, a plant species in the genus Clidemia
 Cochlearia fenestrata, the Arctic scurvy-grass, a plant species in the genus Cochlearia
 Cotinusa fenestrata, a jumping spider species in the genus Cotinusa found in Peru
 Crucigenia fenestrata, an algae species in the genus Crucigenia

See also
 Fenestrata (disambiguation)